Vasili Viktorovich Pavlov (born 24 July 1990) is a Russian former professional football player.

Club career
After their disappointing 0-4 loss to Rosenborg in Tippeligaen on 1 April 2013, Brann signed the tall forward on a four-month loan deal.

Career statistics

External links
 
 
 

1990 births
Living people
Sportspeople from Samara, Russia
Russian footballers
Association football forwards
PFC Krylia Sovetov Samara players
FC Rubin Kazan players
SK Brann players
FC Khimki players
FC Armavir players
FK Ventspils players
FC Chornomorets Odesa players
Latvian Higher League players
Russian expatriate footballers
Expatriate footballers in Norway
Expatriate footballers in Moldova
Expatriate footballers in North Macedonia
Expatriate footballers in Latvia
Expatriate footballers in Ukraine
Russian expatriate sportspeople in Norway
Russian expatriate sportspeople in Moldova
Russian expatriate sportspeople in North Macedonia
Russian expatriate sportspeople in Latvia
Russian expatriate sportspeople in Ukraine